Axel van der Tuuk (born 25 May 2001) is a Dutch professional racing cyclist, who currently rides for UCI Continental team .

He is the younger brother of fellow racing cyclist Danny van der Tuuk, who competes for UCI ProTeam . His mother Kaśka Rogulska is a former speed skater, who competed for both Poland and the Netherlands.

Major results

2018
 1st  Time trial, National Junior Road Championships
 1st E3 BinckBank Classic Junioren
 1st Stage 1 (TTT) Tour du Pays de Vaud
 2nd Guido Reybrouck Classic
 4th Overall Ronde des Vallées
1st Stage 1
 5th Overall La Coupe du Président de la Ville de Grudziądz
1st Stage 3
2019
 1st  Road race, National Junior Road Championships
 1st Stage 2a (ITT) Ronde des Vallées
 3rd E3 BinckBank Classic Junioren
 5th Johan Museeuw Classic
 10th La Route des Géants Saint-Omer–Ypres
2022
 1st  Time trial, National Under-23 Road Championships
 1st Prologue (TTT) Tour de l'Avenir

References

External links

2001 births
Living people
Dutch male cyclists
People from Assen
Cyclists from Drenthe
Dutch people of Polish descent